Windeby I is the name given to the bog body found preserved in a peat bog near Windeby, Northern Germany, in 1952. Until recently, the body was also called the Windeby Girl, since an archeologist believed it to be the body of a 14-year-old girl, because of its slight build. Prof. Heather Gill-Robinson, a Canadian anthropologist and pathologist, used DNA testing to show the body was actually that of a sixteen-year-old boy. The body has been radiocarbon-dated to between 41 BC and 118 AD.

History
The body was discovered by commercial peat cutters in 1952, and is now on display at The Landesmuseum at the Schloß Gottorf in Schleswig, Germany. Unfortunately, by the time the body was noticed by the peat cutters, and before the peat-cutting machinery could be shut down, a hand, a foot, and a leg had been severed from the body. The body had been very well preserved by the peat, and despite this damage it is still an important archaeological discovery. Shortly after the discovery of Windeby I, another bog body (an adult male) was found nearby and dubbed Windeby II.

Description
The body appears to have a half-shaven head and a woollen blindfold tied across the eyes. Recent examinations have however established that the hair over the half of the scalp was not shaven, but had rather decomposed due to being exposed to oxygen a little longer than the rest of the body. The "blindfold" is in fact a woollen band, made using the sprang technique, that was probably used to tie back the boy's shoulder-length hair and which had slipped down over his face after death.

Cause of death
It was thought the body had met with a violent death, but research by Dr. Heather Gill-Robinson has led to this theory being disputed. Jarrett A. Lobell and Samir S. Patel wrote that the body 'shows no signs of trauma, and evidence from the skeleton suggests [he] may have died from repeated bouts of illness or malnutrition.'

See also
 List of bog bodies

Some notable bog bodies
(BCE/CE dates given are radiocarbon dates.)
 Bocksten Man, a modern body from 1290 to 1430 CE, found 1936 in Varberg Municipality, Sweden.
 Borremose Bodies, from 400 to 700 BCE, found 1940s in Himmerland, Denmark.
 Cladh Hallan mummies, from 1600 to 1300 BCE, found on the island of South Uist, Scotland.
 Clonycavan Man, from 392 to 201 BCE, found 2003 in County Meath, Ireland
 Girl of the Uchter Moor, found in 2000 in Uchte, Germany.
 Grauballe Man, from 290 BCE, found 1952 in Jutland, Denmark.
 Haraldskær Woman, from 490 BCE, found 1835 in Jutland, Denmark.
 Lindow Man, from 20 to 90 CE, found 1984 in Cheshire, England.
 Old Croghan Man, from 362 to 175 BCE, found in County Offaly, Ireland.

External links
National Geographic September 2007: "Tales From the Bog"

Sources

References 

1952 archaeological discoveries
Archaeology of Schleswig-Holstein
Bog bodies
Iron Age Germany